Japan participated in the 1978 Asian Games held in Bangkok, Thailand from December 9, 1978 to December 20, 1978. This country was ranked 1st with 70 gold medals, 58 silver medals and 49 bronze medals with a total of 177 medals to secure its top spot in the medal tally.

References

Nations at the 1978 Asian Games
1978
Asian Games